Widdershins is a webcomic by Kate Ashwin.

Synopsis 
Widdershins is set in the magical city of the same name in Yorkshire, England, during the Industrial Revolution. While machines are replacing magic as the main tool of work in many other English cities, technology is banned in the city of Widdershins. The story begins with wizard and stage magician Sidney Malik, who accidentally and unwittingly steals small objects. For this he has been expelled from Widdershins University, and he becomes attached to a bracelet declaring him the King of Thieves. This brings him to the attention of Harriet "Harry" Barber, a treasure hunter and pipe smoker. The two team up to find a greater treasure.

In the second story, two vagrants are forced to work with the city's bureaucracy to deal with "malforms," the destructive results of summoning spells gone awry. Their comical attempts to deal with the malforms are connected to their employer, a local politician who is seeking to put greater restrictions on magic. Other storylines include an ex-soldier making a deal with a spirit of Envy over a musical rivalry and a supernatural tale of cake-making.

Ashwin said in an interview that she started work on Widdershins around 2011, saying that "that there weren't quite enough fun, light-hearted adventure comics out there," and writes each book to be a complete story "since I like resolution".

Reception 
Widdershins, specifically Volume 7, won the British Fantasy Award for Best Comic/Graphic Novel in 2019.

In a review for io9, Lauren Davis said that "Ashwin strikes a comedic tone with her comic that might be too light for some, but her worldbuilding is growing steadily more intriguing and her characters are fun to spend time with". Steve Morris, reviewing Widdershins for ComicsAlliance, described it as "a uniquely English sort of series, inspired as much by the Great British Bake Off as by classic novels gone by."

Author 
Kate Ashwin lives in West Yorkshire and is married. Her first comic was Darken, a D&D-based comic with a main cast of antiheroes. In addition to Widdershins, which she works full time on, Kate Ashwin has also contributed comics to printed collections of fairy tales and to Chemistry World. She has also written a story for Dark Horse Presents, and contributed artwork to a weekly comic for kids called The Phoenix.

External links

References 

2011 webcomic debuts
British webcomics
Fantasy webcomics
Webcomics in print
Comics set in England
Victorian era in popular culture